Violent Lips is a cosmetics company which commercializes temporary tattoo decals for the lips that create designs not possible with traditional lipstick, such as rainbows, animal prints, and polka dots.

History 
Violent lips was founded by Jeff Haddad. At just 13 and 9 years old, Haddad's daughters were playing around with temporary tattoos. As a joke, they affixed them onto their lips and the idea for temporary lip art was born.

In 2011, Violent Lips partnered with Sugar Factory to launch candy-themed temp lip tattoos.

In 2016, the company began making press-on emoji tattoos called Violent Lip "Minis". These temporary tattoos could be applied to the lips or other areas of the face.

The products have been worn by Khloé Kardashian, and her sisters Kendall, Khloe and Kylie Jenner, and also Keyshia Cole.

References

External links
Official Website
Microblading At Currie

Cosmetics companies of the United States
History of cosmetics
Lips
Tattooing